The 2017 Malaysia Super League was the 14th season of the Malaysia Super League, the top-tier professional football league in Malaysia.

The season began on 20 January and concluded on 28 October 2017.

The defending champions were Johor Darul Ta'zim and retained the title from the previous season.

Teams
PDRM and Terengganu were relegated to 2017 Malaysia Premier League after finished 11th and bottom place of 2016 Malaysia Super League. Melaka United and PKNS promoted to 2017 Malaysia Super League after securing place as champions and runners-up in 2016 Malaysia Premier League.

Note: Table lists in alphabetical order.

Locations and stadium

 Primary venues used in the Liga Super:

  1 Correct as of end of 2016 Liga Super season

Personnel and sponsoring

Note: Flags indicate national team as has been defined under FIFA eligibility rules. Players may hold more than one non-FIFA nationality.

 Coaching changes 
Note: Flags indicate national team as has been defined under FIFA eligibility rules. Players may hold more than one non-FIFA nationality.

Foreign players
The number of foreign players is restricted to four per Malaysian League team. A team can use four foreign players on the field in each game, including at least one player from the AFC country.

Note: Flags indicate national team as defined under FIFA eligibility rules. Players may hold more than one FIFA and non-FIFA nationality.

 Players name in bold indicates the player is registered during the mid-season transfer window.
 Foreign players who left their clubs or were de-registered from playing squad due to medical issues or other matters.
 Johor Darul Ta'zim swap the strikers with Johor Darul Ta'zim II

Naturalised players
Note: Flags indicate national team as defined under FIFA eligibility rules. Players may hold more than one FIFA and non-FIFA nationality.

Notes: 
  Carrying Malaysian heritage.
  Participated in the Malaysia national team squad.

 Results 

 League table 

 Result table 

 Positions by round 

Statistics
Top scorers
 

Top assistsAs of 28 October 2017''

Hat-tricks

Notes:
4 Player scored 4 goals; (H) – Home ; (A) – Away

Own goals

Clean sheets

Discipline

Player

Club

Attendances

Overall attendance

Highest and lowest

See also 
 2017 Malaysia Premier League
 2017 Malaysia FAM League
 2017 Malaysia FA Cup
 2017 Malaysia Cup
 2017 Piala Presiden
 2017 Piala Belia
 List of Malaysian football transfers 2017
 List of Malaysian football transfers May–June 2017

References

External links
 Football Association of Malaysia website
 Football Malaysia LLP website

Malaysia Super League
Malaysia Super League seasons
1